Bazyli Skalski was a printer in Cracow in the late sixteenth and early seventeenth centuries. 

Skalski began his printing career in the Drukarnia Łazarzowa, which had been founded in Cracow in the mid-sixteenth century by Łazarz Andrysowicz. Skalski opened his own printing office in 1605 or 1606.  His most famous print was Simon Syrenius's Zielnik in 1613.

Works published

 Seb. Petrycy Horatius w Lirykach. 1609.
 Syrenius, Simon. Zielnik. 1613.
  1611. 
 Xeniolum inclyta Civitati Leopoliensi... 1619.
  1619.

References

External links
 Collection of books printed by Bazyli Skalski in digital library Polona

Polish printers
16th-century Polish people
Polish publishers (people)
Year of birth unknown